Rhys Meynell (born 17 August 1988) is an English professional footballer who plays for Frickley Athletic .

Career
Meynell started his career at Barnsley, where he move up from the club's academy to the reserves, which he captained on a number of occasions in the 2007/08 season.

He spent time on loan at non-league Ossett Albion in 2007, before joining Scottish Premier League side Gretna on loan for the second half of the 2007–08 season on 31 January 2008.

After being released by Barnsley he went on trial at Greenock Morton, Oxford United, Cheltenham Town and Barnet before signing with Conference North side Stalybridge Celtic on 8 August 2008. He made his first appearance for the club coming on as substitute against Tamworth on 12 August 2008.

It was announced he had signed for Telford United at the end of the season on 23 June 2009 but he quickly joined Chester City, having taken part in just one training session at Telford.

In February 2010, he was signed by Galway United a week before the beginning of the 2010 League of Ireland season.
On 20 December 2010 he rejoined Stalybridge Celtic. His second debut for the club came on 1 January 2011 when he played the full match against Hyde.

In May 2012 he joined Guiseley as a defensive midfielder but with guiseley struggling with no left back after injury of Andy Mcwilliams he took the Left Back Role.in the 2013/14 season Mark Bower Signed ex Leeds left back Ben Parker, Meynell has coped with this healthy competition. After Guiseley released him at the end of the 2013/2014 season, he joined Harrogate on a free transfer.

In September 2016 he rejoined Frickley Athletic.

References

External links

1988 births
Living people
English footballers
Footballers from Barnsley
Barnsley F.C. players
Ossett Albion A.F.C. players
Gretna F.C. players
Stalybridge Celtic F.C. players
AFC Telford United players
Chester City F.C. players
Galway United F.C. (1937–2011) players
Guiseley A.F.C. players
Harrogate Town A.F.C. players
Buxton F.C. players
Shaw Lane A.F.C. players
Frickley Athletic F.C. players
Goole A.F.C. players
National League (English football) players
Scottish Premier League players
Association football fullbacks